The Diamond from the Sky is a 1915 American silent adventure-film serial directed by Jacques Jaccard and William Desmond Taylor and starring Lottie Pickford, Irving Cummings, and William Russell.

No copies of this serial’s “chapters” have been found, so the overall production is currently classified as a lost film.

Plot
The prologue in the serial's first episode, "A Heritage of Hate", depicts the discovery of a spectacular diamond inside a meteorite, a gem that later becomes the property of the Stanley family, who call their heirloom “The Diamond From the Sky”. The remainder of the first chapter portrays the intense rivalry between Colonel Arthur Stanley and Judge Lamar Stanley, Virginia aristocrats and descendants of Lord Arthur Stanley, 200 years later.

When a girl is born to the young wife of Colonel Arthur Stanley, the latter, to retain an earldom and “The Diamond From the Sky,” buys a new born Gypsy baby boy and substitutes it for his own babe. Judge Lamar Stanley visits Colonel Arthur Stanley’s home to see the child just as Hagar, the gypsy woman, bursts into the room to demand her boy, and the colonel falls unconscious across the library table.

Cast

Chapter titles

 A Heritage of Hate
 An Eye For An Eye
 The Silent Witness
 The Prodigal's Progress
 For The Sake of A False Friend
 Shadows at Sunrise
 The Fox and The Pig
 A Mind In The Past
 A Runaway Match
 Old Foes With New Faces
 The Web of Destiny
 To The Highest Bidder
 The Man In The Mask
 For Love And Money 
 Desperate Chances 
 The Path of Peril 
 The King of Diamonds and the Queen of Hearts
 The Charm Against Harm
 Fire, Fury And Confusion 
 The Soul Stranglers
 The Lion's Bride 
 The Rose In The Dust
 The Double Cross
 The Mad Millionaire
 A House of Cards
 The Garden of The Gods 
 Mine Own People
 On the Wings of the Morning
 A Deal With Destiny
 The American Earl

Production notes
The serial’s overall storyline was purposely left unfinished in the same manner as The Million Dollar Mystery. A prize of $5,000 was offered for its completion, which was won by Terry Ramsaye.
While on location during the production of the “continued photoplay”, director William Desmond Taylor was nearly electrocuted by an exposed power line. The trade magazine Motion Picture News reported the near tragedy in its August 7, 1915, issue:

See also
List of film serials
List of film serials by studio
List of lost films
Sequel to the Diamond from the Sky (1916)

References

External links

1915 films
American adventure films
American silent serial films
American black-and-white films
Films directed by Jacques Jaccard
Films directed by William Desmond Taylor
Lost American films
American Film Company films
Fictional representations of Romani people
1915 adventure films
1915 lost films
Lost adventure films
1910s American films
Silent adventure films